Leopold Cassella (born 8 December 1766 in Friedberg, Hesse, died 25 March 1847 in Frankfurt) was a German businessman, known for having founded the company Cassella, one of many predecessor companies of today's Sanofi.

Biography

Born David Löb Cassel, he grew up in a Jewish family in Friedberg as the son of a financier. After relocating to Frankfurt, he founded the company Cassel & Reiss with his brother-in-law Isaac Elias Reiss as a spice store in the Jewish Alley. He used the name Leopold Cassella for the first time when he married Nannette Reiss in Frankfurt in 1798, and acquired the Frankfurt burghership in 1812. He was also the founder of the Masonic lodge Zur aufgehenden Morgenröte, which consisted of Frankfurt citizens primarily of the Jewish faith. He had no children of his own, but he raised his niece Rosette Goldschmidt like his own daughter. She married an employee of the firm, Ludwig Aaron Gans, who became Cassella's heir.

Leopold Cassella is interred at the Old Jewish Cemetery, Frankfurt.

References

External links
Grave

Cassella people
People from Friedberg, Hesse
Businesspeople from Frankfurt
1766 births
1847 deaths
Burials at the Old Jewish Cemetery, Frankfurt
German company founders
19th-century German businesspeople
German chemical industry people
German industrialists